Transport in Afghanistan is done mostly by road, rail and air. Much of the nation's road network was built in the mid-20th century but left to ruin during the last two decades of that century due to war and political turmoil. Officials of the current Islamic Emirate have continued to improve the national highways, roads, and bridges. In 2008, there were about 700,000 vehicles registered in Kabul. At least 1,314 traffic collisions were reported in 2022.

Landlocked Afghanistan has no seaports, but the Amu River, which forms part of the nation's border with Turkmenistan, Uzbekistan and Tajikistan, does have substantial traffic. Rebuilding and expanding its airports, roads, rail network, and land ports has led to rapid economic growth in recent years. There are 46 airports in Afghanistan as of 2021.

Road

Most major highways were asphalted around the mid-20th century with assistance from the United States and the Soviet Union. The Soviets built a highway and tunnel through the Salang pass in the 1960s, connecting northern and eastern Afghanistan. A highway connecting the principal cities of Herat, Mazar-i-Sharif, Lashkar Gah, Kandahar, Ghazni, Kabul and Jalalabad, with links to highways in neighboring Pakistan originally formed the primary road system of Afghanistan.

As of 2017, Afghanistan had 17,903 kilometers of paved roads and 17,000 kilometers of unpaved roads, for an approximate total road system of 34,903 kilometers. Traffic in Afghanistan is right hand. In 2008, about 731,607 vehicles were registered in Kabul. At least 1,314 traffic collisions were reported in December 2022. Many vehicles in the country are driven without registration plates. The Afghan government passed a law banning the import of cars older than 10 years. Toyota Corolla has been the most widely used vehicle in the country since the mid-1990s. Afghanistan recently began manufacturing its own cars for domestic consumers. Long distant road journeys are made in private cars, vans, trucks and buses. Many of the national roads are in need of serious repair due to damage caused by overloaded trucks. For this reason, tourists, business people and the upper class prefer using airline service for long distant travels. The national roads can also be dangerous due to accidents and lack of security forces.

Highways
The highway system is currently going through a reconstruction phase. Most of the regional roads are also being repaired or improved. For the last 30 years, the poor state of the Afghan transportation and communication networks has further fragmented and hampered the struggling economy.

The following is a partial list of the major highways in Afghanistan:
Gardez–Pathan Highway in Paktia Province (still under construction as of February 2015)
Jalalabad–Torkham Highway
Kabul–Bamyan Highway
Kabul–Kunduz Highway
Kabul–Khost Highway
Kabul–Ghor-Herat Highway
Kabul–Jalalabad Road (A-1)
Kabul–Herat Highway (A-77)
Kabul–Kandahar Highway (A-1
Kabul–Mazar Highway (A-76)
Kandahar–Bamyan Highway
Kandahar–Boldak Highway
Kandahar–Herat Highway
Kandahar–Tarinkot Highway
Kunduz-Khomri Highway
Kunduz–Fayzabad Highway
Herat–Islam Qala Highway
Herat–Mazar Highway
Route Trident (Lashkar Gah to Gereshk)
Route 606 (Afghanistan)

Official border crossing points
There are over a dozen official border crossing points all around Afghanistan. They include Abu Nasar Port in Farah Province, Angur Ada in Paktika Province, Aqina in Faryab Province, Dand-aw-Patan in Paktia Province, Ghulam Khan in Khost Province, Hairatan in Balkh Province, Islam Qala in Herat Province, Ishkashim in Badakhshan Province, Sher Khan Bandar in Kunduz Province, Spin Boldak in Kandahar Province, Torghundi in Herat Province, Torkham in Nangarhar Province, and Zaranj in Nimruz Province. The Afghanistan-China border crossing at Wakhjir Pass in the Wakhan District is under development since 2021.

The Afghanistan-Tajikistan bridge at Sher Khan Bandar-Panji Poyon connects by road Afghanistan and Tajikistan. It was built by the United States Army Corps of Engineers (USACE) in 2007. The two countries are also connected by the smaller Tajik–Afghan bridge at Tem-Demogan. The Afghanistan–Uzbekistan Friendship Bridge connects Afghanistan by road with Uzbekistan. The Delaram-Zaranj Highway was constructed with Indian assistance and was inaugurated in January 2009.

Taxis, auto rickshaws and urban public transport

Due to the lack of public urban transport systems, taxis and auto rickshaws are highly popular in the major cities, the latter especially in Jalalabad. Kabul demanded a much needed public transport system in the 21st century with a rapid increase in traffic and population, but many projects were canceled or did not complete. The municipality finally launched the city's first in decades, a bus system accompanied by bus stops, in March 2021. Many urban dwellers ride motorcycles, scooters and bicycles, particularly in Herat, Farah, Lashkar Gah and Kandahar.

Rail

Afghanistan has a total of four railway connections with neighboring countries.

Afghanistan-Iran rail connections
A rail line from Khaf in Iran to the city of Herat in Afghanistan has been under construction since 2006. The Iranian line is a  standard gauge. It was reported in December 2020 that the Herat-Khaf railway, which is 225 km long, had reached the Ghoryan District in Herat Province of Afghanistan.

Afghanistan-Turkmenistan rail connections
A 10-kilometer-long  broad gauge line extends from Serhetabat in Turkmenistan to the town of Torghundi in Afghanistan, which is about 115 km to the north of Herat. An upgrade of this Soviet-built line, to renovate and connect the line from Torghundi to Herat, began in 2017.

A second rail connection between the two countries is that which extends from Aqina dry port in Faryab Province of Afghanistan, via Imamnazar to Atamyrat (a.k.a. Kerki), where it connects with the Turkmen rail network. It will be extended from Andkhoy in the future to other parts of Afghanistan.

Afghanistan-Uzbekistan rail connections

There is a 75-kilometer-long rail line between Uzbekistan and the northern Afghan city of Mazar-i-Sharif, all of which is built to  broad gauge. The line begins from Termez and crosses the Amu Darya river on the Soviet-built Afghanistan–Uzbekistan Friendship Bridge, finally reaching a site next to the Mazar-i-Sharif Airport. A survey is being conducted in extending the line to Kabul and then to Peshawar.

Other borders
There are no rail links to Pakistan, China or Tajikistan.

Air

Civil aviation 

Air transport in Afghanistan is provided by the state-owned flag carrier Ariana Afghan Airlines (AAA), as well as the privately owned Kam Air. Domestic flights are available at a number of airports, with international flights taking place to and from Kabul International Airport. Ariana Afghan Airlines operates international flights from Kabul to Delhi, Dubai, Islamabad, Riyadh, and Urumqi, while Kam Air operates international flights to Almaty, Ankara, Delhi, Dushanbe, Islamabad, Istanbul, Jeddah, Kuwait, Sharjah, and Tashkent.

Following the 2021 fall of Kabul and the reestablishment of the Islamic Emirate of Afghanistan, most international flights were suspended. Domestic flights officially resumed in January 2022. Prior to the change in government, airlines such as Air India, Emirates, Gulf Air, Iran Aseman Airlines, Pakistan International Airlines (PIA) and Turkish Airlines operated a number of international flights from airports throughout the country. Currently only three foreign airlines are operating in Afghanistan. They include Pakistan's PIA and the Iranian carrier Mahan Air, which provides links to Mashhad and Tehran. Indian carriers Air India and SpiceJet are expected to resume operations to Kabul in the near future. 

Major airports in Afghanistan include:

International

 Kabul International Airport - The largest airport in Afghanistan and primary hub for international civilian flights located in Kabul.
 Ahmad Shah Baba International Airport - Dual use military airport with civil facilities located in Kandahar. 
 Mazar-i-Sharif International Airport - Dual use military airport with civil facilities in Mazar-i-Sharif.
 Herat International Airport - Dual use military airport with civil facilities in Herat. 

Domestic

 Bamyan Airport, also known as Shahid Mazari Airport, is located in the city of Bamyan, which is the capital of Bamyan Province.
 Bost Airport, also known as Lashkar Gah Airport, is located in Lashkar Gah, the capital of Helmand Province.
 Chaghcharan Airport is located in Chaghcharan, the capital of Ghor Province.
 Farah Airport is located east of the city of Farah, which is the capital of Farah Province.
 Fayzabad Airport is located northwest of Fayzabad, the capital of Badakhshan Province.
 Gardez Airport is located north of Gardez, the capital of Paktia Province.
 Ghazni Airport is located southeast of the city of Ghazni, which is the capital of Ghazni Province.
 Jalalabad Airport, also known as Nangarhar Airport, is located southeast of Jalalabad, the capital of Nangarhar Province.
 Khost Airport is located east of the city of Khost, which is the capital of Khost Province.
 Kunduz Airport is located southeast of the city of Kunduz, the capital of Kunduz Province.
 Logar Airport is located southeast of Puli Alam, the capital of Logar Province.
 Maymana Airport is located northwest of Maymana, which is the capital of Faryab Province.
 Sharan Airport is located southeast of Sharana, the capital of Paktika Province. 
 Tarinkot Airport is located south of Tarinkot, the capital of Uruzgan Province.
 Zaranj Airport, also known as Nimruz Airport, is located east of the city of Zaranj, which is the capital of Nimruz Province.

Military aviation 
Military aviation in Afghanistan had its origins in the 1920s with assistance provided by the British Empire and the Soviet Union. Changing political influence in the country resulted in aircraft orders and military assistant changing between the world superpowers after the Second World War, principally between NATO and the Soviet Union. The current aerial warfare service of Afghanistan is the Afghan Air Force.

Bagram Air Base was originally constructed during the 1950s. It then saw significant expansion during Soviet and later NATO military operations in the region. Its facilities are capable of landing large aircraft such as Boeing 747, Lockheed C-5 Galaxy and Antonov An-124. As a legacy of Soviet and NATO military operations, a large number of military airfields and heliports can be found throughout the country. However, not all of these are in use, and in varying states of repair.

Water

The chief inland waterway of land-locked Afghanistan is the Amu River which forms part of Afghanistan's northern boundary. The river handles barge traffic up to about 500 metric tons. The main river ports are located at Hairatan in Balkh Province and Sher Khan Bandar in Kunduz Province.

Pipelines
There are petroleum pipelines from Bagram into Uzbekistan and Shindand into Turkmenistan. These pipelines have been in disrepair and disuse for years. There are 180 kilometers of natural gas pipelines. The Turkmenistan–Afghanistan–Pakistan–India Pipeline (TAPI) for delivering natural gas from Turkmenistan to India (via Afghanistan and Pakistan) is still under development as of 2022.

See also
Economy of Afghanistan
Geography of Afghanistan
Tourism in Afghanistan

References

External links

Afghanistan Transport Sector Master Plan Update (2017-2036)